Frauenberg may refer to:

 Frauenberg, Rhineland-Palatinate, in Germany
 Frauenberg, Styria, in Austria
 Frauenberg, Moselle, a commune of the Moselle department in France
 Hluboká nad Vltavou, a town in South Bohemia, known as Frauenberg in German
 Frauenberg (Bavaria), a mountain near Grafenau, Bavaria, Germany
 Frauenberg (Hesse), a mountain near Marburg, Hesse, Germany